"'Beware of the Dog" is the second episode of the second season of the American crime-thriller television series Millennium. It premiered on the Fox network on September 26, 1997. The episode was written by Glen Morgan and James Wong, and directed by Allen Coulter. "Beware of the Dog" featured guest appearances by Randy Stone and R. G. Armstrong.

Millennium centers on offender profiler Frank Black (Lance Henriksen), who investigates unusual crimes as part of the private investigative organisation the Millennium Group. In this episode, when Black investigates several killings by a pack of savage dogs, he discovers a strange old man who teaches him more than he ever knew about the Group.

Guest star Armstrong would reprise his role later in the season, while Stone was the casting director for both Millennium and its sister show The X-Files. "Beware of the Dog" received mixed reviews from television critics, and was viewed by approximately 6.37 million households during its original broadcast.

Plot

A couple in a camper van get lost along a country road. They stop near a small town to read their map, but a pack of dogs break into their van, mauling them to death.

Meanwhile, Millennium Group member Peter Watts (Terry O'Quinn) tries to convince fellow Group member Frank Black (Lance Henriksen) to investigate the case. Black is experiencing a separation from his wife and daughter after killing his wife's kidnapper; he initially refuses the case but Watts' insistence sways him. Black arrives in the isolated town of Bucksnort, and visits a local diner. Standing out amongst the residents is Michael Beebe (Randy Stone), who has moved there from Los Angeles. Beebe believes his elderly neighbour may be responsible for the attack and asks Black to investigate.

Black instead examines the crime scene. At sunset, he sees a group of five dogs beginning to follow him. He returns to his hotel, but when he discovers he is locked out the dogs attack him. He fights them off, killing one, and flees to a hospital where he is refused entrance. An elderly man (R. G. Armstrong) drives past, stopping to pick up the dead dog, and drives off again. The remaining dogs follow his pickup truck. Black passes out and is helped into the hospital. The locals believe he is unconscious and discuss the "situation"; however Black is awake and overhears everything, realising there is a greater threat than savage dogs at hand.

The next day, Black finds a group of obelisks in the woods. He is about to examine one when Beebe appears, chased by dogs. The Old Man also arrives, and Black asks him to call off his dogs. The Old Man denies the dogs are his, but they retreat regardless. Black then sees that the obelisks all bear an ouroboros, the symbol of the Millennium Group. He visits the Old Man's home, where the two speak about the Group and its symbolism, and the coming millennium. The Old Man then brings Black to a clearing full of the wild dogs, where the latter realizes they are embodiments of the evil in the world. He approaches them, and stands his ground, being struck by several visions as he does so. The Old Man then explains that the world's balance between good and evil is being lost as the millennium approaches, and that Beebe's home, built on sacred ground, is one of the many small things upsetting this balance.

Black rushes to Beebe's home, knowing the dogs will attack it. Beebe refuses to leave, but the house has been surrounded by five dogs; as they are killed they are seemingly endlessly replaced by others. The Old Man arrives, and insists the only way to rid the town of the dogs is burn down Beebe's house, which the trio do before fleeing. Back home in Seattle, Black refuses to sell his own home, telling his wife that they will move back into it together when their problems are resolved.

Production

"Beware of the Dog" was written by frequent collaborators Glen Morgan and James Wong, and directed by Allen Coulter. The episode was Coulter's first credit for the series, and he would return to helm "The Pest House" and "Siren" later in the second season. "Beware of the Dog" was the fifth episode to have been written by Morgan and Wong, after "Dead Letters", "522666" and "The Thin White Line" in the first season; and the second season première "The Beginning and the End". The duo would go on to pen a further ten episodes over the course of the second season, having taken the roles of co-executive producers for the season.

Guest star Randy Stone was the casting director for Millennium and its sister show The X-Files. Stone was responsible for the casting of Henriksen in the role of Frank Black, and of the two lead roles in The X-Files. "Beware of the Dog" features the first appearance by R. G. Armstrong as The Old Man, a recurring character who would reappear in the two-part episodes "Owls" and "Roosters". Armstrong has been described as "a long-time favorite" of Morgan's.

The episode makes use of Bobby Darin's song "As Long As I'm Singing" in a diegetic manner. Darin's music has been noted by Millennium resident composer Mark Snow as a hallmark of the works of Morgan and Wong. "Beware of the Dog" marked the pair's first use of the singer in Millennium, but his music would later feature in the episodes "Sense and Antisense", "Monster" and "Goodbye Charlie".

Broadcast and reception

"Beware of the Dog" originally aired on the Fox network on September 26, 1997. The episode earned a Nielsen rating of 6.5 during its original broadcast, meaning that  of households in the United States viewed the episode. This represented approximately  households, and left the episode the sixty-ninth most-viewed broadcast that week.

The episode received mixed reviews from television critics. The A.V. Club Zack Handlen gave the episode a B+, finding it "endearingly batshit". Handlen felt that the episode was not entirely cohesive and that its ending was somewhat disappointing, but felt that overall the episode's imagery made up for this—summing up this idea by saying "Millennium often seems to be at its best when sense is a secondary consideration". Bill Gibron, writing for DVD Talk, rated the episode 3.5 out of 5, noting that its "atmospheric elements do not quite add up to a cohesive whole". Gibron felt that this resulted in "an episode that feels like the first half of a bad b-movie". Robert Shearman and Lars Pearson, in their book Wanting to Believe: A Critical Guide to The X-Files, Millennium & The Lone Gunmen, awarded "Beware of the Dog" one-and-a-half stars out of five. Shearman felt the episode was so similar to The X-Files that it gave the impression that Millennium had "lost its own identity". He found that the script contained "enough wit in the dialogue" but that its plot seemed too "vague and elliptical". Writing for the Star Tribune, Bill Ward felt that the episode featured a "lighter" tone than usual, comparing it to The X-Files. Ward described the episode as taking "some nice turns en route to an ambivalent semiresolution".

Notes

Footnotes

References

External links 

Millennium (season 2) episodes
1997 American television episodes
Television episodes directed by Allen Coulter